This is a list of broadcast television stations that are licensed in the U.S. state of North Carolina.

Full-power stations
VC refers to the station's PSIP virtual channel. RF refers to the station's physical RF channel.

Defunct full-power stations
Channel 8: WFXI – Fox – Morehead City (1988–2017)
Channel 18: WFLB-TV – ABC/CBS/NBC – Fayetteville (August 29, 1955 – June 20, 1958)
Channel 26: WTOB-TV – ABC/DuMont – Winston-Salem (September 18, 1953 – May 11, 1957)
Channel 28: WNAO-TV – ABC/CBS/NBC/DuMont – Raleigh (July 12, 1953 – December 31, 1957)
Channel 48: WUBC – Ind. – Greensboro (November 6, 1967 – July 26, 1970)
Channel 62: WISE-TV – CBS/NBC – Asheville (became WANC-TV channel 21, August 2, 1953 – 1978)

LPTV stations

Translators

See also
 North Carolina media
 List of newspapers in North Carolina
 List of defunct newspapers of North Carolina
 List of radio stations in North Carolina
 Media of cities in North Carolina: Asheville, Charlotte, Durham, Fayetteville, Greensboro, High Point, Raleigh, Wilmington, Winston-Salem
 List of Spanish-language television networks in the United States

Bibliography

External links
 
  (Directory ceased in 2017)
 North Carolina Association of Broadcasters

North Carolina
Television stations in North Carolina
Television stations